George Smith (born 20 May 1901) was a Scottish-born footballer who played as a right back in the English Football League in the 1920s.

Born in Glasgow, he joined Notts County from Strathclyde FC, and made his first league appearance for them in 1924–25. Smith went on to play 83 league games for County, with his last coming in 1927–28.

Smith then moved on to West Ham United, but he did not play in a senior game for them.

References

1901 births
Year of death missing
Footballers from Glasgow
Association football defenders
English Football League players
Notts County F.C. players
West Ham United F.C. players
Scottish footballers